Todd Herman is a Canadian-born author and performance coach.

Early life and education
Herman was born and raised on a farm near Medicine Hat, Alberta. He was educated at the University of Alberta. For a year, he played football for the university team. During this time, he participated in Oglivy's competition.

Career
During his career as a coach, Herman has coached various teams, including the New York Yankees and the Danish Olympic team.

In February 2019, he published his first book, The Alter Ego Effect. The book was reviewed by the Delhi Business Review. The following month, the book also made it onto the Wall Street Journal's list of best-selling books. It was also included in Missoulian and Qatar Tribune's list.

In February 2020, he published the children's book My Super Me: Finding the Courage for Tough Stuff.

Herman is also the founder of the 90 Day Year.

Bibliography
 The Alter Ego Effect (2019)
 My Super Me: Finding the Courage for Tough Stuff (2020)

References

Living people
21st-century Canadian non-fiction writers
University of Alberta alumni
Olympic coaches
People from Medicine Hat
Year of birth missing (living people)